Revolution Day is an official Mexican government holiday, celebrated annually in Mexico on November 20, marking the start of what became the Mexican Revolution.

History

The Mexican Revolution brought the overthrow of liberal Army general Porfirio Díaz after 35 years as president of Mexico (1876-1911). In the 1910 presidential election, wealthy landowner Francisco I. Madero opposed Díaz. Díaz jailed Madero, who then escaped, issuing the Plan of San Luis Potosí on October 6, 1910. In that plan, Madero declared the results of the 1910 election fraudulent, nullified them, asserted that he was provisional president, and called for Mexicans to rise up against Díaz on November 20, 1910. He wrote "Throw the usurpers from power, recover your rights as free men, and remember that our ancestors left us a heritage of glory which we are not able to stain. Be as they were: invincible in war, magnanimous in victory."

The commemoration is celebrated in Mexico as an official holiday. Until 2006 and again from 2009 to 2013 the national celebrations were located at the Zocalo in Mexico City. Given the recent political and national tragedies that happened in 2014 the parades were called off at the aftermath of the 2014 Iguala mass kidnapping, (this was the case also in 2015), and the celebrations happened in the Campo Marte in the capital, thus pushing the national parade up to November 23, Navy Day, with only Mexican Navy personnel in attendance. Thus the national November 20 parades, during the remaining years of the Enrique Peña Nieto presidency, had now been replaced by state level ones, which have been held in major cities all over the nation as per tradition, but in a reduced basis, given recent cancellations due to protest actions on the said date in several state capitals. During the presidency of Andrés Manuel López Obrador, the traditional civil-military-athletic parade was finally reinstated in 2019.

The first crucial revolution during the 20th century was the Mexican Revolution. The Mexican Revolution drove many Mexicans to migrate to America. This greatly affected many Mexican Americans as well as the United States. Around 1 million legal migrants entered the United States throughout the revolution along with many other undocumented migrants. This occurred four years before the introduction of a patrol between the borders. The constitution created in 1917, in response to the revolution, established limits on the period of time politicians could be in power. The Constitution also included labor reform laws that covered 8 hour workdays, abolished child labor, and established equal pay.

Date
Article 74 of the Mexican labor law (Ley Federal del Trabajo) provides that the third Monday of November (regardless the date) will be the official Day of the Revolution holiday in Mexico. This was a modification of the law made in 2005, effective since 2006; before then, it was November 20 regardless of the day, and all schools gave extended holidays if the day was a Tuesday or Thursday.

See also 
 Emiliano Zapata
 Francisco I. Madero
 Ricardo Flores Magón
 Mexican Revolution
 Plan of San Luis Potosí
 Revolution Day — in other countries.

References 

Public holidays in Mexico
Fiestas Patrias (Mexico)
Mexican Revolution
1910 in Mexico
Recurring events established in 1910
November observances
Festivals established in 1910
Autumn events in Mexico